The St Helens and Runcorn Gap Railway was an early railway line owned by a company of the same name in Lancashire, England, which opened in 1833. It was later known as St Helens Railway. It ran originally from the town of St Helens to the area which would later develop into the town of Widnes.  Branches were opened to Garston, Warrington and Rainford.  The company was taken over by the London and North Western Railway in 1864.  The line from St Helens to Widnes and the branch to Rainford are now closed, the latter terminating at the Pilkington Glass' Cowley Hill works siding near Gerard's Bridge, but part of the lines to Garston and to Warrington are still in operation.

Independent company 

With the coming of the Industrial Revolution in the 18th century, there was a need for coal to be carried from the coalfields in the area of St Helens to the River Mersey for transportation to the growing industrial towns and cities. The first solution was to build the Sankey Canal which opened in 1755 and ran from the Blackbrook canal via Parr to Sankey Bridges, to the west of Warrington. It was extended to the west, to Fiddlers Ferry, five years later. Encouraged by the success of the Stockton and Darlington Railway which opened in 1825, in 1829 a group of local businessmen arranged for a survey for a line from Cowley Hill Colliery, north of St Helens, to Runcorn Gap on the River Mersey. At this time the Liverpool and Manchester Railway, which ran to the south of St Helens, was being built and its surveyor, Charles Blacker Vignoles, was commissioned to undertake the survey; he was later appointed as the engineer. An Act of Parliament was obtained on 29 May 1830. The original capital was £120,000, one-third of which was raised from local coal owners, salt-makers and Liverpool merchants. These included James Muspratt, soap and alkali manufacturer, and Peter Greenall, who had interests in the brewing, coal and glass manufacturing industries. Peter Greenall was elected as the first chairman of a board of ten directors. At the south end of the railway, Widnes Dock was built, which led into the Mersey. This was the world's first rail-to-ship facility. Because of perceived competition from the railway, the Sankey Canal was extended from Fiddlers Ferry to Runcorn Gap by what was known as the "New Cut". The railway terminated between the dock and the end of the canal and Runcorn Gap station was sited to the north of the canal.

Work on the line proceeded slowly and its costs overran the estimate. It did not open until 1833, but in November 1832 a train with coal wagons ran over the track because of a wager between one of the owners and the engineer that a train would pass over it by December 1832. The line opened officially on 21 February 1833 but the dock was not completed until August 1833. The extension to the Sankey Canal opened on 24 July 1833. From Widnes Dock, a single line crossed the extension to the canal by a swing bridge and then climbed steeply, so steeply that for a section trains had to be pulled by a stationary engine.  Haulage by a stationary engine was also necessary for a section further north at Sutton near St Helens. The Liverpool and Manchester line was crossed by an iron bridge south of St Helens. The line was originally intended for freight but public demand led to passenger coaches being added to the rear of the trains, this service starting in September 1833. There was intense competition between the railway and the canal leading to financial difficulties for both companies; the canal company had reduced its dividends from 33.3% to 5.5% and the railway company was paying no dividend. The companies agreed to a merger, with the railway company buying out the canal company to form the St Helens Canal and Railway Company (SHCR). Royal assent for this was received on 21 July 1845. The company, which owned nine-second-hand tank engines and had a staff of 122, was described as being "ramshackle". It set about to improve the situation, doubling the track and easing the gradients so that the whole line could be operated by steam locomotives.

The new company then set about planning branch lines and connections. There had been a plan to build northwards from St Helens towards Southport to join the Southport and Euxton branch at Rufford. However this line was built only as far as Rainford. Here it joined the Lancashire Union Railway at Gerards Bridge Junction. The company bought land at Garston with the intention of building a dock and linking it with a line to Runcorn Gap. This opened as a single line on 1 July 1852, although the dock was not opened to shipping until 21 July 1853. On 21 May 1851, a sharp curve connection had been made on this line from the main line at what was to become known as Widnes Dock Junction. The following year a new Runcorn Gap station was opened nearer to the rapidly growing town of Widnes. The next project was to build a branch line to Warrington. This was opened on 1 February 1853, extending to a temporary station at White Cross, Warrington.  In the following year it was extended to meet the Warrington and Stockport Railway. A station on this branch was opened at Cuerdley but this closed in January 1858. The creation of these branch lines created an unusual feature on British railways, a flat crossing.  In the 1860s people could travel eastwards from Runcorn Gap to Warrington and, from there, to Manchester, London and many other places. They could also travel west to Liverpool by taking a ship at Garston.

By 1860, there was considerable competition between the railway companies.  The London and North Western Railway (LNWR) wanted to build a line between Edge Hill and Garston. Following discussions, the LNWR leased the line from Garston to Warrington with effect from 1 September 1860, paying £5,000 for the first year and £12,000 annually from 1861. On 29 July 1864, an act was passed which allowed SHCR to be absorbed by LNWR, and the transfer took place on 31 July 1864. Runcorn Gap station was renamed Widnes station on 1 September 1864.

Later developments 

Widnes Dock Junction and the flat crossing were causing problems of congestion and the LNWR dealt with this by building a deviation line of just under  to the north of the original west–east line, crossing the line leading north to St Helens by a bridge. The deviation line was authorised on 5 July 1865 and opened on 1 November 1869. The line was connected to the St Helens and it included a new station for passengers. With the opening of the line from Weaver Junction across the Mersey on Runcorn Railway Bridge to Ditton Junction, west of Widnes, the Garston extension became part of the Liverpool-London main line.  Following the merger of most of Britain's railways into four private companies in 1923, the line from St Helens to Widnes became part of the London, Midland and Scottish Railway (LMS). Large quantities of freight were carried on the line and the passenger train from St Helen's to Ditton Junction station was nicknamed the Ditton Dodger.

Following the end of the Second World War, passenger traffic declined and the service provided by the Ditton Dodger ended on 16 June 1951.  Freight traffic initially continued to be heavy but it declined during the 1960s. In 1969, the line north from Farnworth and Bold station was singled and in 1975 the line south of the station was also singled. The line closed to through traffic on 1 November 1981. The track has been lifted and some of the southern part of the route is occupied by Watkinson Way, a road providing an easterly bypass for Widnes and connecting the Silver Jubilee Bridge with the M62 motorway.  The base of the swing bridge which carried the railway over the canal is still present in Spike Island.

As of 2009, where the line runs near the St Helens Retail Park, the embankment has been reinforced and is said to be for a rail link for visitors from out of town to the new Saints RLFC stadium. It is also rumoured that the track on Robins Lane will be relaid to connect through to St Helens Junction.

Work is close to completion in 2014 to reclaim the section of the railway that ran from Clock Face to Farnworth and Bold as a footpath for walkers and cyclists. Drainage and the majority of the new footpath has now been laid for the public and is already accessible. The footpath can now be enjoyed as part of the reclaimed Sutton Manor Colliery and Jaume Plensa's Dream monument, winner of Channels 4's 'The Big Art Project'.

In the Integrated Rail Plan for the North and Midlands, the UK government proposed using the Warrington Bank Quay to Ditton as part of a new connection to Liverpool from High Speed 2.

Locomotives 

This is not a complete list:

 No.11 Tyne, 0-6-0, became LNWR no.1377, sold to Benjamin Piercy (contractor) in 1865, became no.3 Chancellor on the Wrexham, Mold and Connah's Quay Railway in 1866, scrapped about 1874
 Name/number unknown, 0-6-0, sold to the Bishops Castle Railway which named it Plowden
 Novelty, arrived on the line after its failure in the Rainhill Trials.

References 

Citations

Sources

External links 
 Information about the disused stations on the line
 Information about the disused stations on the line 
 London and North Western Railway Society
 http://newton-le-willows.com : History of the Liverpool and Manchester Railway
Skelmersdale History
The line's history via Grace's Guide

Rail transport in Merseyside
Closed railway lines in North West England
Early British railway companies
London and North Western Railway
Rail transport in Lancashire
Rail transport in Cheshire
History of St Helens, Merseyside
Transport in St Helens, Merseyside
Widnes
Railway companies established in 1830
Railway lines opened in 1833
Railway companies disestablished in 1864
1830 establishments in England
British companies established in 1830
British companies disestablished in 1864